Chevvy Pennycook (born 6 April 1987 in Bristol, England) is a rugby union player for Moseley in the Aviva Championship, who formerly played for Bristol in the Premiership. Chevvy played for England under18s-20s. He plays at flanker. His brother is Bristol player Redford Pennycook Chevvy was selected in the 2012-2013 Rugby Paper Dream team. He retired at 28 after a string of serious neck injuries.

Chevvy represented the England Under 20 side in 2007. He signed for Moseley at the end of the 2008–09 Guinness Premiership.

References

External links
Moseley RFC profile
England profile

1987 births
Living people
English rugby union players
Bristol Bears players
Moseley Rugby Football Club players
Rugby union flankers
Rugby union players from Bristol